Selleck is a surname. Notable people with the surname include:

 Eric Selleck (born 1987), Canadian professional ice hockey player
 Francis Palmer Selleck (1895–1976), mayor
 Gold Selleck Silliman (1732–1790), militia general
 Roda Selleck (1847–1924), American painter
 Roy Selleck (born 1944), Australian footballer
 Roy Selleck (footballer, born 1909) (1909–1972), Australian footballer
 Tom Selleck (born 1945), actor

See also
 Selleck, Washington
 Sylvanus Selleck Gristmill, historical building in Connecticut